Orophea palawanensis is a species of plant in the Annonaceae family. It is endemic to the Philippines.

References

palawanensis
Vulnerable plants
Flora of Palawan
Taxonomy articles created by Polbot